New Centre-Left (Danish: Nyt Centrum-Venstre) is a political party in Denmark. It was founded in June 2020 by party leader Hanna Ziadeh together with Jens Baj and former imam, Ahmed Akkari. The party supports a strong welfare state and is critical of religious influence in Denmark.

References

External links
 Official website

Centrist parties in Denmark
Anti-Islam sentiment in Denmark
Political parties established in 2020
2020 establishments in Denmark